On November 4, 2014, the District of Columbia held an election for its non-voting House delegate representing the District of Columbia's at-large congressional district. The  election coincided with the elections of other federal, state and local offices.

The non-voting delegate is elected for two-year terms. Democrat Eleanor Holmes Norton, who has represented the district since 1991, won re-election to a thirteenth term in office.

Primary results

General election

Candidates
 Eleanor Holmes Norton (Democratic), incumbent Delegate
 Nelson F. Rimensnyder (Republican)
 Natale L. Stracuzzi (D.C. Statehood Green)
 Tim Krepp (independent), tour guide

Results

See also
 United States House of Representatives elections in the District of Columbia

References

External links
 District of Columbia Board of Elections
 Campaign contributions at OpenSecrets
 Outside spending at the Sunlight Foundation

Official campaign websites
Eleanor Holmes Norton campaign website
Nelson Rimensnyder campaign website
Natale Stracuzzi campaign website
Tim Krepp campaign website

District of Columbia
2014
United States House of Representatives